Lalah Hathaway Live is the sixth overall album from singer Lalah Hathaway. The album won Best R&B Album at the 59th Annual Grammy Awards in February 2017. She also earned a Grammmy for Best Traditional R&B Performance for her cover of "Angel" by Anita Baker.

It is the spiritual successor to her father Donny's Live, which was recorded in 1972. In addition to her own songs, there are covers of many songs by artists like Anita Baker ("Angel"), Luther Vandross ("Forever, for Always, for Love"), Vesta Williams ("I'm Coming Back"), Randy Crawford ("When Your Life Was Low"), as well as her father's hits ("Little Ghetto Boy" and "You Were Meant for Me").

Commercial performance
Lalah Hathaway Live debuted at number 33 on the US Billboard 200 chart, selling 15,000 copies in its first week.

Track listing
"Little Ghetto Boy"
"Baby Don't Cry"
"I'm Coming Back"
"You Were Meant for Me"
"Angel"
"These Are the Things"
"Little Girl / Breathe"
"This Is Your Life"
"When Your Life Was Low"
"Forever, for Always, for Love"
"Lean on Me"
"Mirror"
"Brand New" (bonus track)	
"Whatever" (bonus track)
"Give It to Me" (Best Buy exclusive bonus track)
"Love Don't Love Nobody" (Best Buy exclusive bonus track)

Charts

Personnel
Lalah Hathaway – vocals
Michael Aaberg – keyboards, organ
Dennis Clark – vocals
Brian Collier – drums
Errol Cooney – guitar
DJ Spark – DJ
Ben Jones – bass, guitar
Vula Malinga – vocal arrangements, vocals
Jason Morales – vocals
Jairus Mozee – guitar
Phil Peskett – piano
Eric Seats – drums
Eric Smith – bass
Bobby Sparks II – keyboards, organ
Stacey Lamont Sydnor – percussion
Lynette Williams – keyboards

Guest musicians
Robert Glasper

Production
Producers: Darhyl Camper, Divageek, Lalah Hathaway, Ben Jones, Eric Smith
Engineers: Les Cooper, Anthony Jeffries, Benita Lewis (mixing engineer), Coobie Lewis (mastering, mixing), Josh Lewis, Jimi Randolph (monitor engineer), Jeremy Underwood, Brian Vibberts

References

2015 live albums
Grammy Award for Best R&B Album
Lalah Hathaway albums